Boris Peškovič (born 30 June 1976) is a Slovak football coach and a former goalkeeper.

Club career
After starting out professionally with, Peškovič went on to spend most of his career in Poland, representing several clubs. He also played one season in Portugal with Académica de Coimbra and one 1/2 in Romania with CFR Cluj.

In the Ekstraklasa, Peškovič appeared for Świt Nowy Dwór Mazowiecki, Pogoń Szczecin and Górnik Zabrze (two spells with the latter). In January 2012, he left Górnik and moved to the second division with Wisła Płock.

References

External links

Player biography at CEFERE 

1976 births
Living people
Sportspeople from Topoľčany
Slovak footballers
Association football goalkeepers
Slovak Super Liga players
ŠK Slovan Bratislava players
1. FC Tatran Prešov players
Ekstraklasa players
Widzew Łódź players
Pogoń Szczecin players
Zagłębie Sosnowiec players
Górnik Zabrze players
Wisła Płock players
Primeira Liga players
Associação Académica de Coimbra – O.A.F. players
Liga I players
CFR Cluj players
Slovak expatriate footballers
Expatriate footballers in Poland
Expatriate footballers in Portugal
Expatriate footballers in Romania
Slovak expatriate sportspeople in Poland
Slovak expatriate sportspeople in Portugal